The teaching of modern languages, is taught mainly from ages seven to sixteen in primary schools and secondary schools.

History

The 20th Century
Until the 1960s foreign language education was mostly confined to grammar and independent schools. Following the introduction of comprehensive education in the 1960s the provision of language education at secondary level, mostly French, expanded and many primary schools introduced foreign languages as part of the 'Primary School Language Project'. However, by the 1970s the status of French in primary schools was in question with the inflencial report  'Primary French in the Balance' ensuring that 11 was the age that most began studying French.

As part of the National Curriculum a Modern Languages working group was established in 1989. As a result all children at Key Stage 3 and Key Stage 4 were required to study a modern foreign language. However, concerns were expressed as to whether the time devoted to learning modern languages was sufficient for acquisition to take place and the extent to which French had become the dominant language.

2000s
The authoritative report Language Trends has been published annually since 2002 by the British Council.

In 2000, modular AS levels were introduced, to be taken in year 12, which counted 50% towards the final A-level result: it spread the risk of the exam result over two years, but any number of resit exams were possible.

2010s
Since 2014 the National Curriculum has required that pupils in Key Stage 2 must study an ancient or modern foreign language. Pupils in Key Stage 3 must study a modern foreign language.

From September 2016, in England, AS levels no longer counted towards the A-level; many took AS level language courses up to year 12 only; the new A-levels are called linear A-levels.

In 2018, new modern language GCSEs were introduced in England and Wales. In January 2019, the  National Centre for Excellence for Language  was established at the University of York, to coordinate modern language education in England, with nine school hubs across England; of the nine schools, two are grammar schools and two are faith schools.

In 2017, a survey by the CBI found that employers most need people with skills and fluency in French, German and Spanish.

From 2010 to 2018, French GCSE entries dropped by 29% and German GCSE entries dropped by 37%. But Spanish GCSE entries from 2010 to 2018 rose considerably.

From 2011 to 2018, French A-level entries have dropped from around 12,000 to just under 8,000. According to Joint Council for Qualifications, language GCSE entries have halved since 2005. There was a slight increase in French GCSE entries in 2018 and 2019; entries for Spanish are on course to overtake entries for French by 2030.

2020s

Ancient languages are being reintroduced into more English secondary schools, such as Latin. A £4m Department for Education scheme will initially be rolled out across 40 schools as part of a four-year pilot programme for 11- to 16-year-olds starting in September 2022. As well as language teaching, the Latin Excellence Programme will also include visits to Roman heritage sites to provide pupils with a greater understanding of classics and the ancient world. The initiative aims to boost GCSE Latin entries and will be modelled on the success of the Mandarin Excellence Programme, launched in 2016 in response to the growing importance of Mandarin as a global language. The programme now involves 75 schools across the country with more than 6,000 pupils learning Mandarin towards fluency.

Nations

England
Language education in England up to the age of 19 is provided in the National Curriculum by the Department for Education, which was established in 2010.

The National Curriculum for languages aims to ensure that all pupils:
 understand and respond to spoken and written language from a variety of authentic sources 
 speak with increasing confidence, fluency and spontaneity, finding ways of communicating what they want to say, including through discussion and asking questions, and continually improving the accuracy of their pronunciation and intonation
 can write at varying length, for different purposes and audiences, using the variety of grammatical structures that they have learnt
 discover and develop an appreciation of a range of writing in the language studied.

Learning a foreign language is a liberation from insularity and provides an opening to other cultures. A high-quality languages education should foster pupils’ curiosity and deepen their understanding of the world. The teaching should enable pupils to express their ideas and thoughts in another language and to understand and respond to its speakers, both in speech and in writing. It should also provide opportunities for them to communicate for practical purposes, learn new ways of thinking and read great literature in the original language. Language teaching should provide the foundation for learning further languages, equipping pupils to study and work in other countries.

Northern Ireland
Northern Ireland has an exclusively-selective education system; modern languages are broadly well-taught at selective schools.

Primary level
Around 50% of primary teachers either have a degree or A-level in a language. About 70% of primary schools deliver languages in-house, often with a HLTA, a type of teaching assistant who is not QTS standard. Some primary schools work with local secondary schools or sixth form colleges for language training for primary teachers. Around 10% of primary schools have overseas visits, and about 10% participate in eTwinning or the Comenius programme (itself part of the Socrates programme) whereby the scheme involves teacher exchanges abroad. Another project is MEITS (Multilingualism: Empowering Individuals, Transforming Societies).

England

At Key Stage 2 it is compulsory to for primary schools to study ancient and modern languages. French is offered at around 75% of primary schools, with Spanish at about 25% and German at about 5%, with about 45 minutes per week of language learning per school.

Secondary level

England
At Key Stage 3 it is compulsory for secondary schools to study modern languages.

GCSE modern foreign languages and GCSE ancient languages are studied at Key Stage 4. Spanish, French, German, Arabic, Bengali, Mandarin, Greek, Gujarati, Modern Hebrew, Italian, Japanese, Latin, Punjabi, Persian, Polish, Portuguese, Russian, Turkish, and Urdu are studied.

The English Baccalaureate was introduced in 2011, which has modern and ancient language requirements. Languages at GCSE are much more popular at single sex secondary schools than for co-educational state secondary schools; many grammar schools are also single sex schools. Many language teachers are female; in some secondary schools all language teachers are female, supplying limited role models for some teenage males.

Sixth-form level
Modern and classical languages are taught at A-level, with French being most popular (around 8,000) followed by German (around 3,000). It is perceived that top grades are difficult to get in language A-levels.

England
Modular AS levels had been introduced to form 50% of the total A-level result from 2000, but this was stopped from 2016.

University level
Teaching of modern languages at university is well-represented by universities such as those in the Russell Group, but in other universities, such teaching is not represented.

European schools in the United Kingdom
 German School London in south-west London which was established to promote the German language and teach children of embassy staff; it opened in 1971
 Lycée Français Charles de Gaulle in South Kensington; it was set up by the Agency for French Education Abroad and was founded in 1915
 EIFA International School London in Marylebone; run by the Mission laïque française and the French government; it opened in 2013
 Lycée International de Londres Winston Churchill; it opened at Wembley in 2015, opened by President François Hollande on 22 September 2015; 92% get to Russell Group universities
 Instituto Español Vicente Cañada Blanch, situated in Kensington, it was opened in London in 1972, being run by the Spanish government
 European School, Culham in Oxfordshire since 1978, a former European School (the first was in Luxembourg in 1953); since 2017 it has been called the Europa School UK
 Institut français du Royaume-Uni in London since 1910 and the French Institute for Scotland in Edinburgh; set up by the Institut Français, an outreach agency for the French language
 The Swedish School in London
 Greek Secondary School of London
 The Norwegian School in London
 Russian Embassy School in London

Demographics of Language learners and attitudes
Language education in the United Kingdom is predominately done by middle class girls. Most British students find the lessons boring and unengaging.

Results by LEA in England for French
In 2016 there were 8459 entries for French A-level in England, with 5999 entered by the state sector (grammar schools, sixth form colleges and comprehensive schools).

Lowest number of entries for French A-level
 Knowsley 0 (Knowsley only entered 61 A-levels in 2016)
 Sandwell 4
 Blackburn 5
 Luton 5
 Redcar and Cleveland 5
 Thurrock 5
 Wolverhampton 5
 Barnsley 6
 Hartlepool 6
 Stockton 6
 Blackpool 7
 Rochdale 7
 Salford 7
 South Tyneside 7
 Tameside 7
 Barking 9
 Haringey 9
 Bolton 10
 Halton 10
 Middlesbrough 10
 North Lincolnshire 10
 Swindon 10
 Bracknell Forest 11
 Bradford 11
 Tower Hamlets 11
 Hackney 12
 Medway 12
 Sunderland 12
 Gateshead 13
 Southwark 14
 Doncaster 15
 North East Lincolnshire 15
 Southampton 15
 Calderdale 17
 North Somerset 17
 Oldham 17
 Windsor and Maidenhead 17
 Stockport 18
 Stoke-on-Trent 18
 Wakefield 18
 Walsall 18
 Bedford 19
 Coventry 19
 Kingston upon Hull 19
 North Tyneside 19

Outer London enters considerably more French A-levels than Inner London; Inner London enters few French A-levels.

Highest number of entries for French A-level
 Hampshire 223
 Kent 196
 Hertfordshire 182
 Surrey 165
 Essex 148
 Buckinghamshire 143
 Gloucestershire 135
 Lancashire 116
 Oxfordshire 115
 North Yorkshire 107
 Birmingham 104

Results by LEA in England for German
There were 3446 A-level entries for German in 2016 in England, with 2558 entries from the state sector.

Highest number of entries for German A-level
 Hampshire 101
 Hertfordshire 91
 Lancashire 78
 Essex 75
 Kent 64
 Surrey 58
 Lincolnshire 57
 Buckinghamshire 51

See also
 Association for Language Learning, founded in 1990, the association for language education in UK, headquartered in Derbyshire
 Chartered Institute of Linguists, produces The Linguist
 The Modern Humanities Research Association is in Cambridge, and produces The Year's Work in Modern Language Studies
 Subject Centre for Languages Linguistics and Area Studies (LLAS), a former organisation based at the University of Southampton.
 :Category:Language education materials

References

External links
 Association for Language Learning